FIL file may refer to: 

 In Audit Command Language (ACL), a Table Data file. 
 In Application Generator, a File Template.
 In dBASE Application Generator, a Files List Object file. 
 In Mirror (computing), a file containing a saved File Allocation Table (FAT), created by some DOS mirror programs.
 An Overlay (programming) file.
 A Symbian Application Logo File, containing bitmap images used for application icons.